Vyšné Ružbachy is a spa village and municipality in Stará Ľubovňa District in the Prešov Region of northern Slovakia.

History
In historical records the village was first mentioned in 1329.

Geography
The municipality lies at an altitude of 623 metres and covers an area of 17.957 km². It has a population of about 1,296 people.

References

External links

Villages and municipalities in Stará Ľubovňa District

A spa-village (Vysne Ruzbachy - formerly Bad Rauschenbach)